Peter Jeffrey (born 28 July 1975) is a retired English badminton player. He is currently based in National badminton center, Milton Keynes; working as a head coach in National badminton team of England.

Achievements

IBF International 
Men's doubles

Mixed doubles

References 

1975 births
Living people
English male badminton players